The 2020 South African Hip Hop Awards took place on December 12, 2020 and were the 9th edition of the South African Hip Hop Awards. The ceremony celebrates achievements in entertainment and honors music. Themed "The New World Order", the theme idea came from the hard lockdown experience which resulted in people being confined at their homes, glued to their TV sets, computers and being on social media sites such as Twitter, Facebook and Instagram on their phones. It was held virtually due to the effects of the COVID-19 pandemic lockdowns. 

The nominees were announced on 16 November 2020 Cassper Nyovest received the most nominations with 7, ahead of Nasty C and PdotO. The ceremony was hosted by actor and presenter Uncle Vinny.

Winners and nominees
The following is a list of winners and nominees. The winners are in Bold and were initially announced on 12 December 2020 at the ceremony.

References

External link

2020 music awards
2020 awards